The Pehuenche are an indigenous people of Chile and Argentina.

Pehuenche may also refer to:
Pehuenche language
Pehuenche Hydroelectric Plant, in Maule Region, Chile

See also
Pehuenches Department, in Neuquén Province, Argentina